Sunifred (died 848) was the Count of Barcelona as well as many other Catalan and Septimanian counties, including Ausona, Besalú, Girona, Narbonne, Agde, Béziers, Lodève, Melgueil, Cerdanya, Urgell, Conflent and Nîmes, from 834 to 848 (Urgell and Cerdanya) and from 844 to 848 (others).

He may have been the son of Belló, Count of Carcassonne, or, more probably, his son-in-law. In 834, he was named count of Urgell and Cerdanya by Louis the Pious, Holy Roman Emperor; at the time these counties were in the control of Aznar Galíndez I, an ally of the Banu Qasi). Sunifred conquered Cerdanya in 835 and Urgell three years later (838).  

In the dynastic struggles that accompanied the three years between Louis the Pious' death (840) and the Treaty of Verdun (843), Bernard of Septimania, the count of Barcelona (and many other marches and counties, including Septimania, Girona, Narbonne, Béziers, Agde, Melgueil, Nîmes and Toulouse) aligned with Pepin II of Aquitaine, while Sunifred, his brother Sunyer I, Count of Empúries, and their sons (sometimes referred to as the Bellonid dynasty or Bellonids) placed their allegiance with Charles the Bald. 

In 841, the Moors invaded Barcelona and marched against Narbonne through the region of Cerdanya. Sunifred stopped them cold in battle, an event which certainly influenced Charles the Bald's respect for him. For in 844, Charles reclaimed Toulouse from Pepin II, captured Bernard of Septimania, and had him executed. In exchange for his fealty, Charles gave Sunifred the dead count's honours of Barcelona, Girona and the march of Gothia. Sunifred also augmented his domains when Conflent fell into his hands, as reigning count of Cerdanya, on the death of Bera II.

Throughout his reign, he was aloof of William of Septimania, son of Bernard, who had risen in 844 against Charles the Bald. In 848, William was named count of Toulouse and Empúries by Pepin II. He quickly moved to eliminate Sunifred and Sunyer. Both brothers died in 848 and some of their counties were assumed by William. Sunifred supposedly died of natural causes, but the cause of Sunyer's death is unknown.

Sunifred I married Ermesende, and had the following children:
Wilfred the Hairy (died 11 August 897)
Radulf of Besalú (died 920)
Miro the Elder (died 896)

Notes 

848 deaths
Counts of Barcelona
Counts of Cerdanya
Counts of Urgell
Counts of Besalú
9th-century people from the County of Barcelona
9th-century Visigothic people
Year of birth unknown